White Sister(s) may refer to:
 A song by the band Toto from their album Hydra
 White Sister (band), a 1980s music group
 White Sister (novel), a novel by Stephen Cannell
 Arlene White Lawrence and her sisters, who performed as the "White Sisters Trio"
 Missionary Sisters of Our Lady of Africa, a Catholic missionary organization
 Daughters of the Holy Spirit, a Catholic nursing organization
 Bianco, rosso e..., an Italian film internationally released as White Sister
 The White Sisters, an informal name for the P&O ships, RMS Strathnaver and the RMS Strathaird due to their white coloured hulls
 a fictional character in the 2011 role-playing video game Hyperdimension Neptunia Mk2

See also
The White Sister (disambiguation)